Mego was an experimental electronic music independent record label based in Vienna, Austria. The label has been superseded by a new company, Editions Mego, which was set up both to keep Mego albums in print and to issue new albums, run by Peter Rehberg a.k.a. Pita.

Impact and critical acclaim
The label's efforts were awarded a distinction at the Ars Electronica 1999. In the jury's statement, Jim O'Rourke lauded the label's work as defining "a brand new punk computer music".

Mego releases
 MEGO 001  General Magic + Pita: Fridge Trax 12"  (05.1995)
 MEGO 002  General Magic / Elin: Die Mondlandung 12" (05.1995)
 MEGO 003  Stützpunkt Wien 12: UFO Beobachtungen 93-95 2x12" (05.1995) (released on CD by Or, 01.1998)
 MEGO 004  Fennesz: Instrument 12" (10.1995) (tracks appear on Fennesz: Field Recordings, released by Touch 09.2002)
 MEGO 005  DJ DSL: I L.O.V.E. You 12" (10.1995)
 MEGO 006  Sluta Leta: Fan Club 12" (11.1995)
 MEGO 007  The Mego Jacket (08.1995)
 MEGO 008  Farmers Manual: No Backup CD+  (05.1996)
 MEGO 009  Pita: Seven Tons For Free CD (06.1996) (released in Japan by Digital Narcis, 01.1999)
 MEGO 010  General Magic: Frantz CD (06.1997) (released in Japan by Digital Narcis, 06.2003)
 MEGO 011  Potuznik: Amore Motore (...Autobahn) CD (04.1998)
 MEGO 012  Russell Haswell: Live Salvage 1997-2000 CD (04.2001)
 MEGO 013  not released
 MEGO 014  Hecker: IT ISO161975 CD (07.1998)
 MEGO 015  Pure: The End Of Vinyl 3"CD"  (03.1999)
 MEGO 015v  Pure: The End Of Vinyl 12" Picture Disc (04.2001)
 MEGO 016  Fennesz: Hotel Paral.lel CD (09.1997)
 MEGO 017  Farmers Manual: fm 12" (08.1996)
 MEGO 018  Evol: Principio 3" CD (04.1999)
 MEGO 019  Goem: Dertig CM 12" (03.1999)
 MEGO 020  Fennesz: Plays 7" (11.1998) (released a CDS by Moikai, 02.1999)
 MEGO 020t Fennesz: Plays T-shirt (12.1998)
 MEGO 021  gcttcatt: ampErase CD+ (10.2001)
 MEGO 022  Masami Akita/Azuma/Haswell/Sakaibara: Ich Schnitt Mich In Den Finger 12" (05.1997)
 MEGO 023  SKOT presents The Mego Videos 96-98 VHS/PAL (05.1999)
 MEGO 023t SKOT T-shirt (01.1999)
 MEGO 024  Hecker: [R*] iso | chall CD (02.2000)
 MEGO 025  Fuckhead: The Male Comedy (...oder der Traum vom kleinen Glück) CD (10.1998)
 MEGO 026  Fanclub Erdberg/DJ DSL: Anton Polster Du Bist Leiwand 7" (10.1997)
 MEGO 026CD Fanclub Erdberg/DJ DSL: Anton Polster Du Bist Leiwand CDS (10.1997)
 MEGO 027  Zbigniew Karkowski: it 3"CD (06.2000)
 MEGO 028  Nachtstrom: 17 Songs After Midnight LP (07.1999)
 MEGO 029  Pita: Get Out CD (10.1999) (released on vinyl by Moikai, 09.2000)
 MEGO 030  Pure: Noonbugs CD (09.2002)
 MEGO 031  Fennesz/O'Rourke/Rehberg: The Magic Sound Of Fenn O'Berg CD (12.1999)
 MEGO 032  General Magic: Rechenkönig CD (10.2000) 
 MEGO 033  IBM: The Oval Recording LP+7" (01.2001)
 MEGO 034 Francisco López: untitled #92 LP (06.2000)
 MEGO 035 Fennesz: Endless Summer CD (06.2001) (released in Japan by P-Vine, 09.2003)
 MEGO 035v Fennesz: Endless Summer LP (06.2001) 
 MEGO 035t Fennesz: Endless Summer T-shirt (09.2001)
 MEGO 036 not released
 MEGO 037 Ilpo Väisänen: Asuma CD (01.2001) 
 MEGO 038 Evol: Magia Potagia CD (03.2005) 
 MEGO 039 Uli Troyer: NOK 3"CD (09.2000)
 MEGO 040 Merzbow: A Taste Of.. CD (05.2002)
 MEGO 041 ddkern: gern 12" (01.2002)
 MEGO 042 Dr. Nachtstrom: Leidenschaft CD (02.2002)
 MEGO 043 Skot vs. Hecker VHS/PAL (04.2000)
 MEGO 044 Hecker: Sun Pandämonium CD (02.2003)
 MEGO 045 Alexandre Navarro: Horizons 2018 CD (01.2003) 
 MEGO 047 Tujiko Noriko: Shojo Toshi CD (05.2001) (see also eMEGO 047) 
 MEGO 777 Farmers Manual: rla DVD-ROM (03.2003)
 MEGO 049 Pita: Get Down LP (06.2002) 
 MEGO 049t Pita: Get Down T-shirt (09.2002)
 MEGO 050 Jim O'Rourke: I'm Happy, And I'm Singing, And a 1,2,3,4 CD (12.2001) (released in Japan by P-Vine, 09.2002) 
 MEGO 050v Jim O'Rourke: I'm Happy, And I'm Singing, And a 1,2,3,4 LP (01.2002)
 MEGO 051 Massimo: Hey babe, let me see your USB and I'll show you my FireWire 3"CD (11.2001)
 MEGO 052  2002 - 125ccm / 2-stroke race kart (03.2003)
 MEGO 053 Kevin Drumm: Sheer Hellish Miasma CD (05.2002)
 MEGO 054 Fennesz/O'Rourke/Rehberg: The Return Of Fenn O'Berg CD (07.2002) (released in Japan by P-Vine, 09.2002) 
 MEGO 054v Fennesz/Jim O'Rourke/Rehberg: The Return Of Fenn O'Berg LP (07.2002)
 MEGO 055 COH: Mask Of Birth CD (08.2002) 
 MEGO 056 DACM: ShowroomDummies CD (06.2002) 
 MEGO 057 Tujiko Noriko: I Forgot The Title 12" (06.2002)
 MEGO 058 Ilsa Gold: Regretten? Rien! DoCD (10.2003)
 MEGO 059 quintetAvant: Floppy Nails LP (12.2002)
 MEGO 060 Yasunao Tone & Hecker: Palimpsest CD (10.2004) 
 MEGO 061 Mego presents: Playback Device Confusion Volume One featuring Aleph Empire shaped 3"CD (12.2002)
 MEGO 062 Tujiko Noriko: Hard Ni Sasete (Make Me Hard) CD (10.2002) 
 MEGO 063 Massimo: Hello Dirty CD (10.2002) MEGO 064 Hecker: 2 Track 12" (03.2003) (released in collaboration with Synaesthesia, SYN 004)
 MEGO 065 not released
 MEGO 066 BulBul: Drabule 12" (07.2004)
 MEGO 067 COH: Electric Electric 12" (09.2003)
 MEGO 068 not released
 MEGO 069 Russell Haswell & Hecker: Revision single sided 12" (06.2005)
 MEGO 070 Fritz Ostermayer: Kitsch Concrète CD (08.2003) 
 MEGO 071 Zeena Parkins & Ikue Mori: Phantom Orchard CD (05.2004) 
 MEGO 072 Gert-Jan Prins: Risk 3"CD (03.2004)
 MEGO 073 Sluta Leta: Semi Peterson CD (11.2003) 
 MEGO 074 Rob Mazurek: Sweet & Vicious Like Frankenstein CD (01.2004) 
 MEGO 075 Vega/Vainio/Väisänen (VVV): Resurrection River CD (05.2005) 
 MEGO 076 COH: 0397POST-POP DoCD (01.2005) 
 MEGO 077 see eMEGO 077
 MEGO 078 not released
 MEGO 079 dieb13 vs. Takeshi Fumimoto 12" picture vinyl (06.2005)
 MR 001 Radian: tg11 CD (03.2000) (released in collaboration with Rhiz)
 HEC2 Hecker: PV Trecks CD (03.2004)

Editions Mego releases

 eMEGO 080 Anthony Pateras & Robin Fox: Flux Compendium CD (01.2006)
 eMEGO 081 Hecker: Electronic Music Soundtrack for "The Disenchanted Forest x 1001" by Angela Bulloch DoCD (02.2006)
 eMEGO 047 Tujiko Noriko: 少女都市+ (Shojo Toshi+) CD (05.2006)
 eMEGO 077 quintetAvant: En Concert à la Salle des Fêtes CD (07.2006)
 eMEGO 084 KTL CD (10.2006)
 eMEGO 020 Fennesz: Plays 10" vinyl (11.2006)
 eMEGO 035 Fennesz: Endless Summer CD (12.2006)
 eMEGO 078 Tujiko Noriko: Solo CD (02.2007)
 eMEGO 053 Kevin Drumm: Sheer Hellish Miasma CD (03.2007)
 eMEGO 083 Philipp Quehenberger: Phantom In Paradise CD (04.2007)
 eMEGO 085 KTL: 2 CD (05.2007)
 eMEGO 088 Kevin Drumm & Daniel Menche: Gauntlet CD (07.2007)
 eMEGO 085.5 KTL: Eine eiserne Faust in einem Samthandschuh CDR (09.2007)
 eMEGO 016 Fennesz: Hotel Paral.lel CD (09.2007)
 eMEGO 001 General Magic & Pita: Fridge Trax DigitalDownload
 eMEGO 082 Marcus Schmickler: Altars Of Science DVD+ (10.2007)
 eMEGO 086 KTL: Live In Krems LP (12.2007)
 DeMEGO 003 Stephen O'Malley & Attila Csihar: 6°FSKYQUAKE CD (01.2008)
 DeMEGO 002 Gert-Jan Prins: Break Before Make CD (01.2008)
 DeMEGO 001 Silvia Fässler & Billy Roisz: Skylla CD (01.2008)
 eMEGO 087 Angel: Kalmukia CD (01.2008)
 eMEGO 085.5 KTL: IKKI CDR (02.2008)
 eMEGO 090 Popol Vuh: Mika Vainio / Haswell & Hecker Remixes 12" (03.2008)
 eMEGO 029 Pita: Get Out CD (05.2008)
 eMEGO 013 Russell Haswell: Second Live Salvage 2LP (06.2008)
 eMEGO 091 Prurient: Arrowhead CD (07.2008)
 DeMEGO 004 Z'EV vs. PITA : Colchester CD (08.2008)
 eMEGO 089.5 KTL IV PARIS DEMOS CDR (09.2008)
 eMEGO 092 Peter Rehberg: Work For GV 2004-2008 CD (10.2008)
 DeMEGO 005 ibitsu: foolproof betters fools bettering foolproof... CD (11.2008)
 eMEGO 093 Angel: Hedonism CD (12.2008)
 DeMEGO 006 Anthony Pateras & Robin Fox: End Of Daze CD (12.2008)
 eMEGO 089 KTL IV CD (01.2009)
 DeMEGO 007 BJ Nilsen & Stilluppsteypa: Man From Deep River CD (01.2009)
 eMEGO 098 Lucio Capece & Mika Vainio: Trahnie CD (03.2009)
 eMEGO 094 Hecker: Acid In The Style Of David Tudor CD (05.2009)
 eMEGO 050 Jim O'Rourke: I'm Happy, and I'm Singing, a 1,2,3,4 Double CD (05.2009)
 eMEGO 3154 Fenn O'Berg: Magic & Return Double CD (07.2009)
 eMEGO 096 Bruce Gilbert: Oblivio Agitatum CD (10.2009)
 eMEGO 099 Russell Haswell: Wild Tracks CD (10.2009)
 eMEGO 097 Cindytalk: The Crackle Of My Soul CD (11.2009)
 DeMEGO 009 Sister Iodine: Flame Desastre CD (11.2009)
 eMEGO 102 Bruce Gilbert: This Way (25th Anniversary Reissue) CD (12.2009)
 DeMEGO 008 Daniel Menche: Kataract CD (12.2009)
 EMEGO 241 Yasunao Tone AI Deviation #1, #2  CD (2017)

See also 
 List of record labels
 List of electronic music record labels

References

External links
 Official site of Editions Mego

Austrian independent record labels
1994 establishments in Austria
2005 disestablishments in Austria
Record labels established in 1994
Record labels disestablished in 2005
Electronic music record labels
Experimental music record labels
Free improvisation